The Elora Gorge is a popular tourist attraction located at the western edge of Elora, Ontario, Canada, which is 25 km north from the city of Guelph.

Elora Gorge Conservation Area is one of many conservation areas owned by the Grand River Conservation Authority.

About
It was formed from glacial meltwaters from the previous ice age. The area includes a park with camping sites, hiking trails, and is also popular for kayaking and tubing.

Elora Quarry did not become a conservation area until 1976, but it was a popular swimming area long before that. 

Popular activities at the site include: camping, canoeing, fishing, hiking, cycling, swimming, picnicking, and tubing.

The Quarry served as a film location in the 2017 adaptation of Stephen King’s novel It, as well as its 2019 sequel.

Notes

References

External links
 Elora Gorge Conservation Area
 Official web Page of the Village of Elora*
 Fergus Elora Tourism
 Elora Gorge Photo Gallery
 Whitewater kayaking and tubing at Elora Gorge Conservation area

Conservation areas in Ontario
Protected areas of Wellington County, Ontario
Centre Wellington
Grand River (Ontario)